Christos Volikakis (born 25 March 1988, in Volos) is a Greek  track cyclist. He was the leader of the UCI Track Cycling World Cup Classics 2011–2012 in Keirin.

 He is the first Greek who win a gold medal at a World Championship. He has won 4 medals at World Championships, 9 medals at European Championships and several medals at World Cups. He won 2 gold medals at the European Olympic Games in Minsk 2019, as well as a flag bearer at the closing ceremony of the Games. Bronze Medal at the World Cup 2019 in St. Petersburg. He has been crowned World Cup winner in the years 2019–2020, 2018–2019, 2011–2012 while in 2014–2015 & 2016–2017 he was in second place. He has been present 4 times at the Olympic Games in (Beijing in 2008 13th place) in (London in 2012 9th place lost a medal by accident) in (Rio in 2016 12th place) and in Tokyo in 2021.
 He has won over 90 gold medals in Panhellenic Championships, holds 11 national records and is in 1st place in the World rankings in the scratch event, in 1st place in the omnium event and in 3rd place in the points race
 He was the second-best Greek athlete for 2019 in the Public voting behind Giannis Antetokounmpo & in front of Stefanos Tsitsipas. In addition, he was 4th in the Panhellenic voting of the PSAT (Hellenic Sports Press Association).
 He has also been awarded as an up-and-coming talent by the PSAT (Hellenic Sports Press Association).

Biography 

Christos Volikakis is a Greek track cyclist, the most successful of the 2000s, particularly in the speed disciplines. In 2005, as a junior, he became Greek champion in three track discipline (speed, team sprint and team pursuit) and won a title on the road (team time trial).

In 2005, he became the World Champion in keirin at the UCI Juniors Track World Championships in Vienna. He also won two medals at the Junior European Championships 2006 and 2007. In 2007, he won two championship events at the Athens Open, in keirin and team sprint.

At the 2008 UCI Track Cycling World Championships in Manchester, he finished third in the keirin and took the bronze medal.

Between 2006 and 2011, he won eleven national titles.

He won the 2nd place in Keirin at the UCI Track World Cup 2007–2008 in Los Angeles, USA.

In 2008 he represented Greece at the Beijing Olympics in the men's keirin.

He won the gold medal in keirin at the UCI Track World Cup 2011–2012 in Astana, Kazakhstan.

He has also won the silver medal in keirin at the European Elite Track Championship 2011 that was held in Apeldoorn, Netherlands.

In 2012, he again competed in the Olympics, in the men's keirin. He competed in the same event at the 2016 Olympics.

Career highlights

Greek Championship

2003     2nd in National Championship, Road, ITT, Novices, Greece, Volos (GRE)
2003    2nd in National Championship, Road, Novices, Greece, Volos (GRE)
2004    1st in National Championship, Track, 500 m, Novices, Greece, Athens (GRE)
2004    3rd in National Championship, Road, ITT, Novices, Greece, Dervenochoria (GRE)
2004    1st in National Championship, Road, Novices, Greece, Dervenochoria (GRE)
2005    1st n National Championship, Track, Sprint, Juniors, Greece, Athens (GRE)
2005    2nd in National Championship, Track, 1 km, Juniors, Greece (GRE)
2005    1st in National Championship, Track, Team Pursuit, Juniors, Greece (GRE)  + Vasileios Galanis, Alexandros Floros, Athanassios Evdokiou,
2005    1st in National Championship, Track, Team Sprint, Juniors, Greece (GRE)  + Vasileios Galanis, Alexandros Floros,
2005    1st in National Championship, Road, TTT, Juniors, Greece, Thiva (GRE)  + Athanassios Evdokiou, Vasileios Galanis, Alexandros Floros,
2006    1st in National Championship, Track, Team Sprint, Juniors, Greece (GRE)  + Zafeiris Volikakis, Nikolaos Dimotakis,
2006    1st in Nation Championship, Track, 1 km, Juniors, Greece (GRE)
2006    2nd in National Championship, Track, Sprint, Juniors, Greece (GRE)
2006    5th in OXI Memorial Climb Race, Juniors, Bafi, Parnitha (GRE)
2007    2nd in National Championship, Track, 1 km, Elite, Greece (GRE)
2007    2nd in National Championship, Track, Sprint, Elite, Greece (GRE)
2007    1st in National Championship, Track, Team Sprint, Elite, Greece (GRE)  + Zafeiris Volikakis, Vasileios Galanis,
2007    1st in National Championship, Track, Keirin, Elite, Greece (GRE)
2009    1st in National Championship, Track, 1 km, Elite, Greece, Athens (GRE)
2009    1st in National Champioip, Track, Keirin, Elite, Greece, Athens (GRE)
2011    1st in National Championsh Track, Keirin, Elite, Greece (GRE)
2011    1st in National Championship, Track, Team Pursuit, Elite, Greece (GRE)  + Apostolos Bouglas, Alexandros Papaderos, Stavros Papadimitrakis,
2011    1st in National Championship, Track, Team Sprint, Elite, Greece (GRE)  + Georgios Bouglas, Zafeiris Volikakis,
2011    1st in National Championship, Track, Sprint, Elite, Greece (GRE)
2011    1st in National Championship, Track, 1, Elite, Greece (GRE)

Balkan Open

2007    1st in Athens Open Balkan Championship, Track, Team Sprint, Elite/U23, Greece, Athens (GRE)  + Athanasios Mantzouranis, Panagiotis Voukelatos,
2007    2nd in Athens Open Balkan Championship, Track, Sprint, Elite/U23, Greece, Athens (GRE)
2007    1st in Athens Open Balkan Championship, TracKeirin, Elite/U23, Greece, Athens (GRE)

European Juniors/U23 Championship

2005    2nd in European Championship, Track, Keirin, Juniors, Fiorenzuola
2006    2nd in European Championship, Track, Team Sprint, Juniors, Athens
2006    6th in European Championship, Track, Keirin, Juniors, Athens
2006    9th in European Championship, Track, Scratch Race, Juniors, Athens
2007    4th in European Championship, Track, Keirin, U23, Cottbuss
2008    4th in European Championship, Track, Keirin, U23, Pruszków
2009    3rd in European Championship, Track, Keirin, U23, Minsk

World Grand Prix

2011    3rd in Dudenhofen, Keirin (GER)
2011    1st in Moscow, Keirin (RUS)
2011    1st in Mos, Sprint (RUS)

European Elite Championship

2011    2nd in European Championship, Track, Keirin, Elite, Apeldoorn

UCI World Cup Classics

2008    2nd in Los Angeles, Keirin (USA)
2008    5th in Sydney, Keirin (AUS)
2010    4th in Melbourne, Keirin (AUS)
2010    8th in Cali, Keirin (COL)
2011    1st in Astana, Keirin (KAZ)

UCI World Championships

2005     1st in World Championship, Track, Keirin, Juniors, Wien
2006    3rd in World Championship, Track, Team Sprint, Juniors, Gent
2006    6th in World Championship, Track, Keirin, Juniors, Gent
2008    3rd in World Championship, Track, Keirin, Elite
2009    8th in World Championship, Track, Keirin, Elite, Pruszków
2010    13th in World Championship, Track, Team Sprint, Elite, København
2010    13th in World Championship, Track, Keirin, Elite, København
2010    36th in World Championship, Track, Sprint, Elite, København

References

External links
 
 

1988 births
Living people
Greek male cyclists
Greek track cyclists
Cyclists at the 2008 Summer Olympics
Cyclists at the 2012 Summer Olympics
Cyclists at the 2016 Summer Olympics
Cyclists at the 2020 Summer Olympics
Olympic cyclists of Greece
Panathinaikos cyclists
Sportspeople from Volos
Cyclists at the 2019 European Games
European Games medalists in cycling
European Games gold medalists for Greece